The 2010 New England Revolution season is the fifteenth season of the team's existence. The regular season began on March 27, 2010 with a 1–0 loss to the LA Galaxy and ended on October 21 with a 2–0 loss at the New York Red Bulls.

After their 2–2 draw with the Columbus Crew on September 25, the Revs were officially eliminated from playoff contention. It was the first time the Revs failed to qualify for the playoffs since Steve Nicol became coach in 2002.

Background 
The Revs finished the 2009 season third in the Eastern Conference and seventh overall, qualifying for the playoffs as a wild card. After defeating the Chicago Fire 2–1 in the first leg of their playoff series, they lost the second leg 2–0 and failed to advance.

Much of the offseason was spent trying to fill the holes created by the departures of veterans Jay Heaps and Steve Ralston. The former retired and eventually became a part of the Revs broadcast team. The latter joined newly formed AC St. Louis in the Division 2 Pro League. These holes were filled primarily through the draft and a trade that sent Wells Thompson and Jeff Larentowicz to the Colorado Rapids in exchange for defender Cory Gibbs and Goalkeeper Preston Burpo.

For 2010, the Revs also signed Senegalese midfielder Joseph Niouky and Serbian midfielder Marko Perovic and released Costa Rican defender Gabriel Badilla.

Review

Preseason 
The Revs began training for the 2010 Major League Soccer season on February 1, 2010 inside the Dana Farber Fieldhouse at Gillette Stadium, the same indoor practice facility used by the New England Patriots. The team did most of its preparations for the season in Foxborough, but took two preseason road trips, one to Orlando in February, and the other to North Carolina in March.

In Orlando, the Revs played their first two preseason games of the year. On February 23, they lost to FC Dallas 2–0 on goals from Atiba Harris and Marvin Chávez. Two days later they got a much better result against a team of Florida College All-stars, winning 6–0.

The Revs' stay in North Carolina was longer than their Orlando trip. After arriving on March 10, the team spent 12 days in the state, playing three preseason games in the process. The first game saw the Revs defeat the Charlotte Eagles 2–0 on goals from Kheli Dube and Zack Schilawski. Next the team faced Duke University in a game that ended in a 1–1 draw. The Revs finished their preseason schedule with a 2–1 win over the Carolina Railhawks in which Schilawski scored the game winner in the 87th minute.

During the North Carolina trip, the Revs were also joined by three trialists. Midfielders Gareth Williams and Andres Raad didn't end up signing, while Serbian midfielder Marko Perović joined the team in early April after the season had begun.

March 
New England began their 15th Major League Soccer regular season on the road against the LA Galaxy on March 27, 2010. They lost 1–0 on a fourth-minute goal by Edson Buddle.

April

On the field
April started more positively for the Revs with a 2–0 win at rival D.C. United on April 3, 2010 behind two goals in two minutes from second-half substitute Kenny Mansally. The momentum continued with the Revs home opener against Toronto FC on April 10. After going down a goal at halftime, the Revs answered with four goals in 19 minutes in the second half, including a 12-minute hat-trick by rookie Zack Schilawski, only the third hat-trick by a rookie in MLS history.

On April 17, the Revs made their second cross-country trip of the young season. And like the first trip, it ended in defeat, this time to the San Jose Earthquakes 2–0.

The Revs finished the month with a disappointing home loss against the Colorado Rapids. After going down 1–0 in the fourteenth minute, the Revs equalized through an impressive free kick by Marko Perović, the Serbian's first MLS goal. Colorado controlled possession for most of the game, however, and Pablo Mastroeni made them pay with a game-winner in the 73rd minute.

Off the field
On April 26, the Revs announced that midfielder Shalrie Joseph had been granted an indefinite leave of absence from the team for personal reasons. He had missed four of the team's first five games, and made an instant impact in the one game he did start, the 4–1 victory over Toronto.

On the last day of the month, the Revolution announced their second international friendly of the season. This one will be played against Brazilian club Cruzeiro on June 13 at Gillette Stadium.

May

On the field
The Revolution played eight games in May, the most in a single month since August 2008, when they also played eight games. Six of the games were in MLS league play. The other two were a U.S. Open Cup qualifier at the New York Red Bulls on May 12, and a friendly against Portuguese club Benfica on May 19.

On May 1, the Revolution drew FC Dallas 1–1 in a match that featured 12 cards. The team again struggled to maintain possession, and were lucky to come away with a point after both Kheli Dube and Joseph Niouky were ejected in the second half. Just four days after salvaging a point against Dallas, the Revs hosted Chivas USA on May 5 at Gillette Stadium. For the second game in a row, the team went down a man. This time Marko Perovic was the guilty party, earning a red card in the 28th minute. The Revs went on to lose the game 4–0. Another quick turnaround saw the team play a much better game in Columbus on May 8. Rookie Zak Boggs, starting because of injuries and Perovic's suspension, scored his first two MLS goals. The game was tied 2–2 until the first minute of stoppage time, when Robbie Rogers put the Crew up for good.

The Revs next match was a U.S. Open Cup qualifier at the New York Red Bulls on Wednesday May 12, 2010. The team lost 3–0 and thus failed to qualify for the competition. Their next league match was a scoreless draw at home against the San Jose Earthquakes on May 15. The Revolution then played a friendly match against Portuguese champions Benfica on May 19, which they lost 4–0. Their return to league play at Toronto FC on May 22 was also the return of Shalrie Joseph, who had played only one game (also against Toronto) because of injury and suspension. Despite the return of their captain, the Revs lost the game 1–0.

The team finished its May schedule with a 3–2 win against New York Red Bulls at home on Saturday, May 29, 2010. During the game, Preston Burpo fractured his lower right leg in a collision with the Red Bulls' Dane Richards.

Off the field
On May 14, the team released Honduran midfielder Mauricio Castro. He had yet to make an appearance in 2010 due to injury. Castro's departure leaves the team with a vacant roster spot, which could be filled by one of the three trialists joining the Revs for their friendly against Benfica. Serbian defender Ivan Gvozdenovic (a former teammate of current Rev Marko Perovic), English defensive midfielder and 2010 SuperDraft pick Jason Griffiths, and Haiti national team player Jean-Baptiste Fritzson were all available and played against Benfica.

On May 21, Frank Dell'Apa reported on the Boston Globe's Corner Kicks blog that Shalrie Joseph would be available for the following day's game against Toronto FC after completing a 5-game suspension as part of his entrance into the league's substance abuse program.

June

On the field
After an 8-game May schedule, the Revolution played only 3 in the month of June because of the 2010 FIFA World Cup break. The month's first match was a 3–0 loss to Seattle Sounders FC in Seattle. The Revs were back in action on June 13 for a friendly against Brazilian club Cruzeiro, which they lost 3–0 on a hat-trick by Wellington Paulista. When the Revs' regular season returned to action on June 27, the team's poor form continued with a 1–0 home defeat to the Chicago Fire.

Off the field
On June 8, the Revolution announced that it had resigned Steve Ralston from AC St. Louis. The MLS all-time leader in assists, appearances, starts, and minutes was given back the number 14, which he had worn in his first stint with the club. Sainey Nyassi, who had been wearing number 14, took the number 17 jersey. Ralston returned to the field for the Revs in their friendly against Cruzeiro and promptly dislocated his left elbow. He's expected to miss four to six weeks.

On June 24, the team signed midfielder Jason Griffiths, whom it had drafted in the third round of the 2010 MLS SuperDraft. Griffiths made his first appearance as a substitute in the Revs' 1–0 loss to the Chicago Fire three days later.

July

On the field
July began the same way June ended for the Revs, with a loss. For the second year in a row, the team was blown out by Real Salt Lake in Utah, this time by a 5–0 scoreline (last year the Revs lost the same fixture 6-0). The Revolution looked unlikely to fare much better against the league leading LA Galaxy at Gillette Stadium the following week, but surprised many by pulling out a 2–0 win, the team's first victory since May.

Mid-July saw the Revs take a break from MLS play to participate in SuperLiga 2010. The team was drawn into group B, which also included the Chicago Fire from MLS and Mexican sides Pumas UNAM and Monarcas Morelia. The Revs won their opening match against Pumas 1–0 on Zack Schilawski's team-leading 6th goal across all competitions. SuperLiga 2010 continued for the Revs on June 17 in Chicago with a 1–0 win over the Fire that clinched them a berth in the semifinals. The team returned to Gillette Stadium to finish up group play against Morelia on the 20th. Once again, the Revs won by a 1–0 scoreline, with Perovic again the goalscorer. The win made the Revolution the first team ever to post a perfect record (3-0-0) in SuperLiga group play.

The team's last match of the month was its first-ever trip to PPL Park, the new stadium of the expansion Philadelphia Union. After falling behind in the 25th minute on a goal from Sebastian Le Toux, the Revs equalized through Marko Perovic's 4th goal in 5 games across all competitions. SuperLiga will resume in early August, when the Revs will play a semifinal match against Mexican club Puebla.

Off the field
Former Revolution captain Steve Ralston announced his retirement from professional soccer after the team's SuperLiga match against Morelia on July 20. Two days later, he joined the Houston Dynamo as an assistant coach. Ralston had played in only one game during his return to the Revs, a friendly defeat to Brazilian club Cruzeiro during which he dislocated his elbow.

On July 26, the team announced that it had waived Michael Videira. He had made 12 appearances for the Revs since joining the team in 2009, but had yet to make an appearance during the 2010 season. The move, paired with Ralston's retirement, left the team with two vacant roster spots. These spots were then filled on July 30, when the team announced the signings of Serbian forward Ilija Stolica and Brazilian midfielder/forward Roberto Linck.

August

On the field
The Revs began the month of August with a win on penalties over Puebla F.C. in the SuperLiga semifinals. The match ended 1–1 after 90 minutes and went straight to penalties, where the Revolution prevailed 5–3. Kenny Mansally was the game's hero, scoring the team's only goal and converting the winning penalty. The Revs will host the SuperLiga final on September 1 at 7 p.m.

The club's first league match of the month was a 1–0 win over D.C. United in Foxborough on August 7. Pat Phelan scored the only goal, the first of his MLS career, in the 42nd minute off of a Chris Tierney free kick. Next up for the Revs was a home match against the Houston Dynamo on Saturday, August 14. The team extended their unbeaten streak to 8 games in all competitions with yet another 1–0 win. The lone goal came from Ilija Stolica, who made his first start against the Dynamo.

On August 18, the Revs began a two-game road-trip with a 2–1 loss to the Chicago Fire. Marko Perovic gave the Revs the lead in the 16th minute with his team-leading 7th goal of the season across all competitions, but it wasn't enough, as the Fire came back to win on an 85th-minute goal by Calen Carr. The road-trip ended point-less as the Revs fell to the Kansas City Wizards 4–1 on August 21.

The month's schedule came to a close with the Revolution's first home match against the Philadelphia Union on August 28. After taking an early lead and conceding a late equalizer, the Revs looked likely to get at least some points out of the match until a Philly found a stoppage time winner from Justin Mapp.

Off the field
On August 11, 2010, the team reached a termination agreement with Senagalese midfielder Joseph Niouky. Despite regularly featuring in Steve Nicol's lineup throughout the season, Niouky was never popular with Revs fans, who felt he failed to contribute on the pitch.

September

On the field
After a promising run through July and early August, the Revs began September stumbling. They went into the SuperLiga final on September 1 riding a three-game losing streak. which was soon extended to four with a 2–1 loss to Monarcas Morelia of Mexico.

The club returned to league play on September 4 with a home match against Seattle Sounders FC. The Revs started the game well, creating several chances, but they went down 1–0 in the 59th minute on a goal from Steve Zakuani. Instead of succumbing, however, the Revolution battled back, eventually winning the match 3–1 on goals from Chris Tierney, Marko Perovic, and Kheli Dube, who returned after a lengthy injury absence. Unfortunately for the Revolution, they were unable to build on the Seattle win, losing their next match against Chivas USA 2–0.

The Revolution's road woes continued the following week, when they lost 3–0 on the road to the Colorado Rapids. Their road trip continued midweek at FC Dallas, where the Revs took the Hoops by surprise, jumping out to a 2–0 lead on goals from Shalrie Joseph (his first of the year) and Ilija Stolica. When David Ferreira missed a penalty late in the first half, it looked like it was going to be the Revs' night, but a second half penalty from Ferreira and a goal from Jeff Cunningham on literally the second-to-last kick of the match gave FCD a 2–2 draw.

Things started well for the Revs against Columbus four days later, but ended in a case of deja vu for the home team. New England once again scored an early goal, this time through Pat Phelan in the second minute. The Revs again extended their lead in the second half, this time on a penalty from Shalrie Joseph. And once again, the Revs' opponents were able to come from behind to secure a 2–2 draw, this time through goals from Steven Lenhart and Guillermo Barros Schelotto. The result officially eliminated the Revolution from the 2010 MLS Cup Playoffs.

Off the field
On September 30, the team announced that it had released Lithuanian forward Edgaras Jankauskas. The injury-prone forward scored 2 goals in 14 appearances for the Revolution, most of them in 2009.

October

On the field
The Revs began the month with another promising, but ultimately frustrating performance, this time against Real Salt Lake. New England possessed the ball well against the defending MLS Cup champs, and looked destined to capture a share of the points after Kenny Mansally's 82nd-minute equalizer, but just two minutes later Álvaro Saborío gave Salt Lake the win.

The club's good run of form finally turned into three points the following week, when the Revs defeated the Houston Dynamo 2–1 for just their second road win of the season. They continued their winning ways the following week with a 1–0 win over the Kansas City Wizards in their final home match of the year. The Revolution win knocked Kansas City out of playoff contention. The club's final match of the 2010 season will take place on October 21, 2010 at the New York Red Bulls. It will be the Revs' first visit to Red Bull Arena.

Off the field
Before their final home match of the year against Kansas City on October 16, the Revolution announced the winners of their 2010 team awards. Marko Perović was named the team's MVP for the year after leading the team with eight goals across all competitions. Kevin Alston won the club's best defender award, while Taylor Twellman named the Revolution's MLS W.O.R.K.S. Humanitarian of the Year.

Match results

Pre-season

MLS regular season

Open Cup

Friendlies

SuperLiga

Standings 

Conference

Overall

Results summary

Current roster 
As of September 30, 2010.

Kits

Notes

New England Revolution seasons
New England Revolution
New England Revolution
New England Revolution
Sports competitions in Foxborough, Massachusetts